Light Ahead is Japanese pop musician Iconiq's first extended play, released on September 15, 2010. The extended play features three songs from Change Myself, the lead single "Tokyo Lady," and three previously unpublished songs. The DVD features three music videos directed by Diane Martel, as well as footage from Iconiq's debut Japanese concert in May, 2010. On the cover she is shown turning round with some kind of headdress made of animal fur.

Background

The extended play is Iconiq's third physical release in Japan, after her debut album Change Myself in March 2010, and her first physical single "Tokyo Lady" a month prior. Change Myself saw moderate commercial success, debuting at #3 and eventually selling over 60,000 copies. "Tokyo Lady" also saw some success, debuting in the top 20.

Promotion

Much of the promotion of the EP centred on "Tokyo Lady," which was her fourth song used as the Shiseido Maquillage range commercial song, and the third commercial to feature Iconiq personally. The song was also used in a range of commercials for Recochoku, Weider and Jelly products and A-Nation 2010. Iconiq performed at A-Nation concerts in early August, including being one of the featured musicians on the Tetsuya Komuro-written theme song for the event, "Thx a Lot".

Three music videos were produced for the songs on the EP, including the video for "Tokyo Lady." The videos were all directed by veteran American music video director Diane Martel. One of these songs, the title track "Light Ahead," was used in commercials for Maquillage in September.

Track listing

Chart rankings

Reported sales

Personnel

Personnel details were sourced from Light Aheads liner notes booklet.ManagerialAkira Akutsu – advisory producer
Hidemi Arasaki – advisory producer
Ryuhei Chiba – general producer
Shinya Egawa – A&R assistant
Hideki Endo – advisory producer
Tomomi Fujisawa – A&R
Shinji Hayashi – general producer
Yasuto Hoyamatsu – artist management supervisor
Hiroshi Inagaki – executive supervisor
Hitoshi Itagaki – artist management chief
Nae Kodama – A&R desk
Takuji Koga – sound director

Takuya Konishi – artist management
Harumasa Maeda – advisory producer
Masato "Max" Matsuura – executive supervisor
Hiroaki Nishiyama – A&R supervisor
Nobutoshi Ono – Chief A&R
Yoshihiro Seki – executive supervisor
Hiroshi Shibuya – production co-ordinator (#4)
Shigekazu Takeuchi – general producer
Masatoshi Uchida – A&R supervisor
Akihiko Yamamoto – Chief A&R
Kyoko Yoshioka – artist management deskPerformance creditsHiro – instruments (#3)
Iconiq – vocals, background vocals
T. Kura – instruments (#1, #7)
Tomokazu "T.O.M" Matsuzawa – instruments (#5)

U-key Zone – instruments (#4)
UTA – instruments (#2)
Verbal – rap (#4)Visuals and imageryMasaki Hanahara – designer
Tadashi Harada – hair
Satoshi Hirota – stylist
Shiho Kikuchi – graphic designer
Yasuyuki Nagashima – producer
Ai Nieda – make-up

Yuki Otani – designer
Sonomi Sato – art director
Satoshi Saikusa – photographer
Nobuko Yamada – make-up
Koji Yamamoto – creative director
Yoshihiro Yoshida – graphic designerTechnical and production'

Tom Coyne – mastering
D.O.I. – mixing (at Daimonion Recordings)
Taiki Fudanotsuji – assistant engineer
Hiro – production (#3), programming (#3)
Kami Kaoru – vocal production (#6)
Kgro – vocal recording (#3)
T. Kura – production (#1, #7), vocal recording (#1)
Tomokazu "T.O.M" Matsuzawa – production (#6)
Michico – vocal production (#1, #7)
Momo "Mocha" N. – vocal production (#4)
NaNa Music – vocal production (#2)

Kohei Nakatake – assistant engineer
Hisashi Nawata – additional arrangement (#5)
Tomoe Nishikawa – vocal recording (#2)
Osamu Shirota – vocal recording (#5)
Yohei Takita – vocal recording (#4)
U-key Zone – production (#4), vocal production (#4)
UTA – production (#2), programming (#2), vocal production (#2)
Lucas Valentine – recording (#5)
Verbal – production (#5)
Yutaro Wada – assistant engineer
Tatsuhiro Yoshida – vocal recording (#6—7)

Release history

References

External links 
 Official website 

2010 EPs
Avex Group EPs
Japanese-language EPs